William Grady Stigler (July 7, 1891 – August 21, 1952) was an American lawyer, World War I veteran, and politician who served four terms as and a U.S. Representative from Oklahoma from 1944 to 1952.

Biography
Stigler was a citizen of the Choctaw Nation of Oklahoma and is listed as three-eights Choctaw on the Dawes Rolls He was born the son of Joseph S. and Mary Jane Folsom Stigler in Stigler, Haskell County, Indian Territory (now Oklahoma). He attended the public schools, and graduated from Northeastern State College, Tahlequah, Oklahoma, in 1912. He also attended the law school of the University of Oklahoma at Norman.

Career
During World War I, he served as a Second Lieutenant in the 357th Infantry Regiment of the 90th Division in 1918 and 1919, with overseas service. He attended the University of Grenoble in France during 1919.

Admitted to the Oklahoma Bar Association in 1920, Stigler commenced practice in Stigler, Oklahoma. He was city attorney of Stigler from 1920 to 1924. He served in the Oklahoma State Senate 1924 to 1932, serving as president pro tempore in 1931. He also served as Lieutenant Colonel in the 45th Division of the Oklahoma National Guard 1925-1938.

Family 
On June 7, 1925, he married Ona Beller. The couple had two daughters, Denyse and Elaine.

Congress 
Stigler was elected as a Democrat to the Seventy-eighth Congress to fill the vacancy caused by the resignation of Jack Nichols. He was reelected to the Seventy-ninth and to the three succeeding Congresses and served from March 28, 1944, until his death.

He was the only Choctaw elected to the U.S. Congress until the 2022 election of Republican Josh Brecheen.

Death
Stigler died in Stigler, Haskell County, Okla., August 21, 1952 (age 61 years, 45 days). He is interred at Stigler Cemetery, Stigler, Oklahoma.

See also
 List of Native Americans in the United States Congress
 List of United States Congress members who died in office (1950–99)

References

External links
 
 Retrieved on 2008-03-24
 William G. Stigler Collection and Photograph Series at the Carl Albert Center
 

1891 births
1952 deaths
20th-century American politicians
20th-century Native American politicians
United States Army personnel of World War I
Democratic Party members of the United States House of Representatives from Oklahoma
Native American members of the United States Congress
Choctaw Nation of Oklahoma state legislators in Oklahoma
Northeastern State University alumni
Oklahoma lawyers
Democratic Party Oklahoma state senators
People of Indian Territory
People from Haskell County, Oklahoma
United States Army officers
University of Oklahoma alumni
20th-century American lawyers